Russ's Market is a Nebraska-based grocery chain that operates stores in the communities of Lincoln and Hastings. Russ's Market is owned by B&R Stores, Inc., a Nebraska corporation.

History

Russ Raybould and Clayton Burnett, two former Safeway employees, founded the company in May, 1964 when they acquired a small neighborhood grocery store together at 17th and Washington Streets in south Lincoln, Nebraska.  Mr. Raybould eventually purchased the interest of Mr. Burnett and today B&R Stores, Inc. in Lincoln, Nebraska.

Under Raybould's direction, B&R Stores, Inc. grew significantly.  Expansion occurred both through acquisitions and development of new stores.  Growth began in 1979 with the opening of a new  Russ's Market at 66th and O Streets in Lincoln. Two years later the company acquired an existing store in southeast Lincoln at 33rd Street and Nebraska Parkway.

The company expanded into Hastings, Nebraska, by acquiring a store in 1984. In 1995, three Food-4-Less stores in Lincoln were acquired, becoming the company's fifth, sixth, and seventh Russ's Market stores. In 2001, B&R Stores, Inc. built a new Russ's Market at Coddington and West A Streets in Lincoln.

Today B&R Stores, Inc., operates Russ's Market stores in Lincoln and Hastings, and one in Glenwood, Iowa. Russ's son, Pat Raybould, serves as president of the company.  The company has been recognized by the Nebraska Department of Economic Development for its work to promote the use of reusable shopping bags.  In addition to operating the Russ's Market stores, B&R Stores, Inc. operates ten Super Saver stores in Nebraska and western Iowa, Save Best in Lincoln and the Grand Central Apple Market in Kearney, Nebraska.

On May 22, 2017 it was announced that B&R Stores, Inc. will acquire the Lovegrove's Grocery in Waverly, Nebraska.  The store will be rebranded as a Russ's Market Express.

References

External links 
Russ's Market website

Supermarkets of the United States
Companies based in Lincoln, Nebraska
American companies established in 1964
Retail companies established in 1964